Chief Peter Fatomilola (born 16 January 1946) is a Nigerian dramatist, film actor, poet and prolific playwright.

Early life
Fatomilola was born on 16 January 1946 in the town of Ifisin-Ekiti in Ido-Osi Local Government area of Ekiti State, Nigeria, to Chief Abraham Ojo Fatomilola and Mrs. Elizabeth Fatomilola. He is a son of Chief Ifa Priest, known as the Oluwo (Olu-awo, meaning Lord of the oracle), which was believed to have influenced his herbalist role in Nigerian film. His mother was from the town of Isare-Oge in Kwara State. In 1967, he joined the Olokun Theatre group under the tutelage of the late Professor Ola Rotimi, a renowned dramatist and prolific playwright at the University of Ife, now Obafemi Awolowo University.
He is also a member of the academic staff of Obafemi Awolowo University, where he obtained a Bachelor of Arts degree in Theatre Arts in 1978.
He was the first Papa Ajasco, a lead role in a comedy film produced by Wale Adenuga.
He had featured in several notable Nigerian films such as Sango, an epic African film produced by Obafemi Lasode and scripted by Wale Ogunyemi in 1997. He has acted the role of the priest in several Yoruba films.

Filmography 

 Papa Ajasco
 Rise of the Saints (2020)
 King Invincible

Personal life
He is married with several wives, including one who sells local concoctions and herbs (Iya Fat) at a market at the Obafemi Awolowo University. He has 11 children. In addition, he has several chieftaincy titles around Yorubaland, including Oluwo (Chief Ifa Priest) in his hometown of Ifisin-Ekiti and Amuludun in Ile-Ife.

References

Living people
1946 births
Yoruba male actors
Nigerian male film actors
Nigerian male poets
Nigerian dramatists and playwrights
People from Ekiti State
20th-century Nigerian male actors
21st-century Nigerian male actors
20th-century Nigerian poets
21st-century Nigerian poets
Male actors in Yoruba cinema